Võhu is a village in Vinni Parish, Lääne-Viru County, in northeastern Estonia.

References

 

Villages in Lääne-Viru County